The president of the Chamber of Advisors of Tunisia was the presiding officer of that body. From the creation of the Chamber of Advisors in 2002 until its replacement first by the Constituent Assembly in 2011 and then by the Assembly of the Representatives of the People in 2014, it was the upper house of the Parliament of Tunisia.

List

See also
Chamber of Advisors
Constituent Assembly of Tunisia
Assembly of the Representatives of the People (Tunisia)

Politics of Tunisia
Tunisia, Chamber of Advisors, Presidents